Nguyễn is the most common Vietnamese surname, held by an estimated 40 percent of Vietnamese people. Outside of Vietnam, the surname is commonly rendered without diacritics, as Nguyen. The following is an incomplete list of individuals with this surname.

Heads of state or government
Nguyễn Cao Kỳ, former prime minister of South Vietnam (1930–2011)
Nguyễn dynasty, ruled Vietnam from 1802 to 1945
Gia Long (born Nguyễn Phúc Ánh, 1762–1820)
Minh Mạng (born Nguyễn Phúc Đởm)
Thiệu Trị (born Nguyễn Phúc Miên Tông)
Tự Đức (born Nguyễn Phúc Hồng Nhậm)
Dục Đức (born Nguyễn Phúc Ưng Chân)
Hiệp Hòa (born Nguyễn Phúc Hồng Dật)
Kiến Phúc (born Nguyễn Phúc Ưng Đăng)
Hàm Nghi (born Nguyễn Phúc Ưng Lịch)
Đồng Khánh (born Nguyễn Phúc Ưng Đường)
Thành Thái (born Nguyễn Phúc Bửu Lân)
Duy Tân (born Nguyễn Phúc Vĩnh San, 1899–1945)
Khải Định (born Nguyễn Phúc Bửu Đảo, d. 1925)
Bảo Đại (born Nguyễn Phúc Vĩnh Thụy, 1913–1997)
Nguyễn Hữu Thọ (1910–1996)
Nguyễn Khánh, prime minister of South Vietnam (1927–2013)
Empress Nam Phương, consort of Bảo Đại, born Nguyễn Hữu Thị Lan
Nguyễn lords, the precursors to the Nguyễn Dynasty, who ruled southern Vietnam from 1558 to 1775
Nguyễn Kim (1476–1545)
Nguyễn Hoàng (1525–1613)
Nguyễn Phúc Nguyên (1563–1635)
Nguyễn Phúc Lan (1601–1648)
Nguyễn Phúc Tần (1620–1687)
Nguyễn Phúc Thái (1650–1691)
Nguyễn Phúc Chu (1675–1725)
Nguyễn Phúc Thụ (also spelled Nguyễn Phúc Chú, 1696–1738)
Nguyễn Phúc Khoát (1714–1765)
Nguyễn Phúc Thuần (1754–1777)
Nguyễn Minh Triết, president of Vietnam (b. 1942)
Nguyễn Ngọc Thơ, Prime Minister of South Vietnam (1908–1976)
Nguyễn Phan Long, Prime Minister (1889–1960)
Hồ Chí Minh, Vietnamese Communist statesman and revolutionary; founded independent Vietnam (born Nguyễn Sinh Cung, 1890–1969)
Nguyễn Tấn Dũng, Prime Minister of Vietnam (b. 1949)
Nguyễn Thị Anh, queen of Vietnam (1422?–1459)
Nguyễn Văn Tâm, Prime Minister
Nguyễn Văn Thiệu, general and president of South Vietnam (1923–2001)
Tây Sơn dynasty, founded by the Tây Sơn brothers (Nguyễn Nhạc, Nguyễn Lữ, and Nguyễn Huệ), ruled from 1778 to 1802
Nguyễn Huệ, ruled as Emperor Quang Trung (1753–1792)

Actors and television personalities
Dustin Nguyen, Vietnamese American television and film actor (b. 1962)
Jillian Nguyen, Australian actress
Navia Nguyen, model and actress
Thai Nguyen, Vietnamese-American fashion designer and television personality

Artists
Dustin Nguyen, comic book artist
Jacqueline Hoang Nguyen, artist
Mike Nguyen, artist

Athletes
Ben Nguyen, American mixed martial arts fighter (b. 1988)
Daniel Nguyen, Vietnamese-American tennis player (b. 1990)
Dat Nguyen, American NFL linebacker (Dallas Cowboys)  (b. 1975)
Dat Nguyen (boxer), Vietnamese-American boxer and bare-knuckle boxer (b. 1982)
Don Nguyen, American professional skateboarder (b. 1979)
Lee Nguyen, American footballer (Randers FC, New England Revolution) (b. 1986)
Marcel Nguyen, German gymnast (b. 1987)
Nam Nguyen, Canadian figure skater (b. 1998)
Nguyễn Lộc, martial artist (1912–1960)
Nguyễn Minh Phương, Vietnamese footballer (b. 1980)
Nguyễn Văn Hùng, martial artist (b. 1980)
Rob Nguyen, Australian racing car driver (b. 1980)

Chess players
Nguyễn Ngọc Trường Sơn (b. 1990)

Journalists
Betty Nguyen, CNN news anchor
Chau Nguyen, Houston-area news anchor (b. 1973)
Émilie Tran Nguyen (born 1985), French journalist
Leyna Nguyen, Los Angeles-area news anchor (b. 1969)
Nguyen Qui Duc, Vietnamese American writer
Vicky Nguyen, San Jose-area news reporter
Mary Nguyen, Orlando area news reporter

Military
Nguyễn Chánh Thi, ARVN general (1923–2007)
Nguyễn Chí Thanh, Vietnam People's Army (PAVN) general
Nguyễn Hồng Nhị, North Vietnamese fighter pilot
Nguyễn Hữu Có, ARVN general
Nguyễn Khoa Nam, ARVN general (1927–1975)
Nguyễn Qúy An, air force major (b. 1943)
Nguyễn Văn Cốc, North Vietnamese fighter pilot (b. 1943)
Nguyễn Văn Cử, pilot and lieutenant in the Republic of Vietnam Air Force (b. 1934)
Nguyễn Văn Hiếu, ARVN general (1929–1975)
Nguyễn Văn Hinh, military chief of state
Nguyễn Văn Nhung, assassin of Ngo Dinh Diem (d. 1964)
Nguyễn Văn Minh, ARVN general
Nguyễn Văn Toàn, ARVN general (1932–2005)
Nguyễn Văn Bảy, North Vietnamese fighter ace (1936–2019)
Nguyễn Ngọc Loan, ARVN General

Models
Nguyễn Diệu Hoa, Miss Vietnam (b. 1969)
Navia Nguyen (b. 1973)
Tila Tequila, model, singer, Internet personality, and reality star (born Tila Nguyen in 1981)
Nguyễn Thúc Thùy Tiên, model and Miss Grand International 2021 (b. 1998)
Nguyễn Thùy Lâm, model, competed in Miss Universe 2008 and made into the top 15. (b. 1987)
Nguyễn Minh Tú, model, Asia's Next Top Model Cycle 5 runner-up, model mentor in Asia's Next Top Model Cycle 6 and The Face Vietnam 2 and a candidate in Miss Supranational 2018 representing Vietnam
Nikita Dragun, Belgian-American YouTuber, make-up artist and model

Musicians
Duy Khánh, singer/composer born Nguyễn Văn Diệp
Minh Nguyen, known as Kid Trunks, rapper from Broward County, Florida (b. 2000)
Nguyễn Cao Kỳ Duyên, Vietnamese American singer (b. 1969)
Hoàng Hải, singer (born Nguyễn Hoàng Hải in 1982)
Khánh Ly, singer (born Nguyễn Lệ Mai in 1945)
Phương Vy, singer; winner of 2007 Vietnam Idol competition (born Nguyễn Ngọc Phương Vy in 1987)
Quynh Nguyen, classical pianist (b. 1976)
Thao Nguyen, indie-rock/alternative-folk singer and songwriter from Virginia
Michael Ray Nguyen-Stevenson, American rapper (also known as Tyga)
Nguyễn Thiên Đạo, composer (1940–2015)
Trish Thuy Trang (born Nguyễn Thùy Trang), Vietnamese-American singer and songwriter
Tila Nguyen, better known by her stage name Tila Tequila, a Singapore-born French-Vietnamese American singer-songwriter and reality star
Văn Cao, popular songwriter who wrote the national anthem of Vietnam, Tiến Quân Ca (born Nguyễn Văn Cao, 1923–1995)

Physicians
Nguyen Van Nghi, practitioner of traditional medicine (1909–1999)

Poets
Nguyễn Bỉnh Khiêm, considered a saint by the Cao Đài religion (1492–1587)
Nguyễn Chí Thiện, dissident poet (1939–2012)
Nguyễn Du, wrote The Tale of Kiều (1765–1820)
Hoa Nguyen, American poet (b. 1967)
Nguyễn Khuyến (1835–1909)
Tố Hữu (born Nguyễn Kim Thành, 1920–2002)
Nguyễn Trãi, poet and national and cultural hero of Vietnam (1380–1442)
Nguyễn Công Trứ, poet and general (1778–1858)

Poker players
Danny Nguyen
Men Nguyen (b. 1954)
Minh Nguyen
Scotty Nguyen (b. 1962)

Politicians
Nguyễn Bá Thanh (1953–2015)
Nguyễn Hợp Đoàn, mayor of Saigon (1928–2002)
Nguyễn Hữu Thọ, Vietnamese lawyer and politician; founder of the NLF (1910–1996)
Nguyễn Phú Trọng (b. 1944)
Nguyễn Sinh Hùng, First Deputy Prime Minister of Vietnam
Nguyễn Thị Bình, former NLF fighter and vice president of Vietnam
Nguyễn Thiện Nhân, Vietnamese Minister of Education (1953–2015)
Nguyễn Tiến Hưng,  former Minister of Economic Development and Planning of Republic of Vietnam, writer.
Nguyễn Văn An (b. 1937)
Nguyễn Văn Linh, NLF fighter in the Vietnam War, 1986–1991 General Secretary of the Communist Party of Vietnam (1915–1998)
Nguyễn Văn Tường, Nguyễn Dynasty regent (1824–1886)
Nguyễn Văn Vy, ARVN general
Janet Nguyen, California state legislator

Religious leaders
John-Baptiste Nguyễn Bửu Đồng (born Nguyễn Phước Bửu Đồng), Vietnamese Roman Catholic priest
Thích Nhất Hạnh (born Nguyễn Xuân Bảo, 1926–2022), Buddhist monk and author
Thadeus Nguyễn Văn Lý, Roman Catholic priest and prominent Vietnamese dissident
Antoine Nguyễn Văn Thiện, oldest bishop of the Roman Catholic Church (1906–2012)
François-Xavier Cardinal Nguyễn Văn Thuận, Roman Catholic cardinal (1928–2002)

Revolutionaries
Nguyễn Hải Thần (c. 1878–1959)
Cường Để (born Nguyễn Phúc Đan, 1882–1951), Nguyễn Dynasty prince
Nguyễn Quyền, anti-colonial activist (1869–1941)
Nguyễn Thái Học, Vietnamese revolutionary; founded the Nationalist Party of Vietnam (1901–1930)
Nguyễn Thần Hiến, anti-colonial activist (1856–1914)
Nguyễn Thượng Hiền, anti-colonial activist (1865–1925)
Nguyễn Thị Định (1920–1992)
Nguyễn Trung Trực, anti-French resistance leader (1837–1868)

Scientists
 Prince Bửu Hội, organic/biochemistry/medical researcher, published more than 1000 papers (born Nguyễn Phúc Bửu Hội in 1915)
Nguyen Xuan Vinh (1930–2022)
Nguyen Dinh Duc (b. 1963) composite material scientist

Writers
Nguyễn Đình Thi (1924–2003)
Kien Nguyen (b. 1967)
Nguyễn Nhật Ánh, popular children's author (b. 1955)
Nguyễn Ngọc Ngạn, Vietnamese Canadian writer (b. 1946) 
Qui Nguyen, playwright
Huong Keenleyside (born Nguyen Thi Huong in 1971)
Nguyễn Thuyên, 13th century official and writer
Viet Thanh Nguyen, Vietnamese American writer (b. 1971)

Other
Nguyễn Hữu Bài, minister to the royal court at Huế
Nguyễn Hữu Chánh, anti-communist activist (b. 1952)
Nguyễn Huy Đẩu, anti-communist activist (1914–2008)
James Nguyen, film director (b. 1966)
Nguyễn Khác Chính, anti-communist activist (1924–2016)
Nguyễn Lạc Hoá, Catholic priest and anti-communist fighter (1908–c. 1989)
Luke Nguyen, a Vietnamese Australian chef, food writer and TV documentary host (b. 1977)
Nguyễn Mạnh Tường, lawyer and intellectual (1909–1997)
Peter Nguyen, Catholic activist (b. 1958)
Nguyen Si Binh, anti-communist activist
Tan Duc Thanh Nguyen, drug smuggler (1983–2018)
Nguyễn Trường Tộ, 19th-century social reformer (1830–1871)
Nguyễn Tường Vân, Vietnamese Australian drug trafficker (1980–2005)
Nguyễn Văn Trỗi, would-be assassin of Robert McNamara (1947–1964)

Fictional people
Nguyen Charlie, cartoon character
Nguyen Toon, mythical North Vietnamese fighter pilot
Pham Nuwen, of the science fiction novel A Fire Upon the Deep, is treated as a far-future descendant of the Nguyen surname.
Diane Nguyen, a main character in BoJack Horseman
Dong Nguyen, one of the title character's love interests in Unbreakable Kimmy Schmidt
 Tyler Nguyen-Baker, supporting character in Pixar's Turning Red
 Mrs. Nguyen, a character in Better Call Saul

References

Lists of people by surname
Vietnamese-language surnames